"All You Wanted" is a song by American singer-songwriter Michelle Branch, released as the second single from her debut album, The Spirit Room (2001). Written by Branch and produced by John Shanks, the song was released in the United States by Maverick Records on January 7, 2002.

"All You Wanted" received generally positive reviews and became a top-10 hit in the United States, reaching number six on the Billboard Hot 100 and surpassing the peak of Branch's debut single, "Everywhere". The song also performed well in New Zealand, reaching number three on the RIANZ Singles Chart—one place shy of the peak of "Everywhere". Elsewhere, "All You Wanted" underperformed in Europe and stalled inside the top 30 in Australia.

Background and composition
"All You Wanted" was written by Branch and produced by John Shanks. The song is written in the key of A-flat major with a tempo of 96 beats per minute. Lyrically, it talks about a heartbreak. Branch said of the song, "I feel like everybody wants to find someone who you feel understood by and will be there to catch you when you fall, and that's what 'All You Wanted' is about."

Critical reception
"All You Wanted" received mostly positive reviews from music critics. In 2009, Sputnikmusic said that the song was the most recognizable while reviewing Branch's The Spirit Room album. Jeff C of Popdirt called the track amazing while reviewing The Spirit Room in 2002. In December 2005, Pam Avoledo embraced the song, she called it "a teen fairytale worth believing in."

Hot Sauce Reviews called "All You Wanted" a favorite and that its one of the tracks that were "listenable, tuneful, and they are great for singalongs too". In 2003, IGN Music stated that "The lyrics, while not the deepest, are not simple or cheesy by any means." They added that "The song features some nice guitar work and again, an insanely catchy chorus." British online newspaper The Independent referred to the track as an "anthemic head rush".

Chart performance
"All You Wanted" entered the US Billboard Hot 100 on the week ending February 23, 2002, and stayed on the charts for 28 weeks, peaking at number six on May 25. The song became Branch's first top-10 hit, as well as her second-highest-peaking single, after "The Game of Love" and "Everywhere".

Music video
The music video was directed by Liz Friedlander. It begins with Branch entering a club where her boyfriend is. During the chorus, everything around her freezes, and she takes the opportunity to sing at him, "If you want to, I can save you, I can take you away from here..." assuming he cannot hear her. They then go on a bus together, she sits down, assuming he will sit next to her, but he runs into friends and ignores her. She again sings at him during the chorus. After they exit the bus, it begins to rain and her surroundings are again frozen, and she sings at him, but she then notices that her boyfriend's watch is still ticking. When she realizes this, her boyfriend looks at her, the rain is still stopped. She realizes he was able to hear everything she said before the rain begins to pour again, and she runs away.

In 2002, the video was nominated on MTV Video Music Awards in two categories: Best Female Video and Best Pop Video.

Track listings

UK CD single
 "All You Wanted" – 3:38
 "Everywhere" (acoustic version) – 3:32
 "If Only She Knew" – 4:19
 "All You Wanted" (video)

German CD single
 "All You Wanted" – 3:38
 "Everywhere" (acoustic version) – 3:32

Australian CD single
 "All You Wanted" – 3:38
 "Everywhere" (acoustic version) – 3:32
 "If Only She Knew" – 4:19

Japanese CD single – "All You Wanted" / "Everywhere"
 "All You Wanted" – 3:38
 "Everywhere" – 3:36
 "Goodbye to You" (unplugged version) – 4:09

Credits and personnel
Credits are lifted from The Spirit Room album booklet.

Studios
 Recorded at Sunset Sound, Henson Recording Studios, and Ananda Studios (Hollywood, California)
 Mixed at Image Recorders (Hollywood, California)
 Mastered at Marcussen Mastering (Los Angeles)

Personnel

 Michelle Branch – writing, guitars, keyboards
 John Shanks – guitars, bass, keyboards, programming, production
 Patrick Warren – keyboards
 Kenny Aronoff – drums
 Vinnie Colaiuta – drums
 Lars Fox – programming, engineering, Pro Tools editing
 Chris Lord-Alge – mixing
 Marc DeSisto – engineering
 Stephen Marcussen – mastering

Charts

Weekly charts

Year-end charts

Release history

Covers and media usage
 "All You Wanted" Was covered by Deamons Art in 2021 from the album Rain Days.
 "All You Wanted" is featured in the Karaoke Revolution video game series.
 "All You Wanted" was featured at the end of the pilot episode of the TV series Birds Of Prey.
 Taylor Swift grew up a fan of Branch and has covered "All You Wanted" during concerts.

References

2001 songs
2002 singles
Maverick Records singles
Michelle Branch songs
Music videos directed by Liz Friedlander
Song recordings produced by John Shanks
Songs about heartache
Songs containing the I–V-vi-IV progression
Songs written by Michelle Branch
Warner Music Group singles